Brian O'Neil (born 4 January 1944 in Bedlington) is a former footballer who played for Burnley, Southampton and Huddersfield Town in the 1960s and 1970s.

References

1944 births
Living people
People from Bedlington
Footballers from Northumberland
English footballers
England under-23 international footballers
Association football midfielders
English Football League players
Burnley F.C. players
Southampton F.C. players
Huddersfield Town A.F.C. players
English Football League representative players
Bideford A.F.C. players